The following is a list of notable deaths in July 2006.

Entries for each day are listed alphabetically by surname. A typical entry lists information in the following sequence:
 Name, age, country of citizenship at birth, subsequent country of citizenship (if applicable), reason for notability, cause of death (if known), and reference.

July 2006

1
Umberto Abronzino, 85, Italian-born American member of US National Soccer Hall of Fame as an administrator.
Michael Barton, 91, English Surrey cricketer and president.
Edwin Broderick, 89, American Roman Catholic Bishop of Albany, New York, and director of Catholic Relief Services.
Willie Denson, 69, American singer and songwriter ("Mama Said"), lung cancer.
Irving Green, 90, American record industry executive, co-founder of Mercury Records.
Ryutaro Hashimoto, 68, Japanese politician, Prime Minister of Japan (1996–1998).
Jabron Hashmi, 24, British soldier, first British Muslim to die in "War on Terror.".
Louis Jacobs, 85, British rabbi and founder of Masorti movement.
Yousuf Khan, 70, Indian footballer, represented India in soccer at 1960 Summer Olympics, heart attack.
Robert Lepikson, 54, Estonian businessman and politician.
Roderick MacLeish, 80, U.S. journalist, author and filmmaker.
Padmakar Pandit, 71, Indian cricket umpire.
Philip Rieff, 83, American sociologist and author.
Fred Trueman, 75, English and Yorkshire cricketer, lung cancer.
Robbie "Rocket" Watts, 47, Australian guitarist for the Cosmic Psychos.

2
Maurice Fox-Strangways, 9th Earl of Ilchester, 86, British peer and engineer, member House of Lords and RAF group captain.
Balázs Horváth, 64, Hungarian politician, former Interior Minister, lung cancer.
Herty Lewites, 65, Nicaraguan presidential candidate.
Jan Murray, 89, American Borscht Belt comedian.
Tihomir Ognjanov, 79, Serbian footballer for Yugoslavia, played in the 1950 FIFA World Cup.
Joan Quennell, 82, British Conservative MP for Petersfield 1960–1974.
Anatole Shub, 78, American journalist and author on Russia. Complications of pneumonia and a stroke.
Jeffrey Wasserman, 59, American painter.

3
Mark Aubrey Tennyson, 5th Baron Tennyson, 86, British aristocrat, great-grandson of poet Lord Tennyson.
Francis Cammaerts, 90, British Special Operations Executive (SOE) agent, led 30,000 French Resistance fighters.
Dick Dickey, 79, American basketball player with the Boston Celtics and North Carolina State University.
Gerhard Fischer, 84, Norwegian-born German diplomat.
Joseph Goguen, 65, American computer scientist from UCSD.
Benjamin Hendrickson, 55, American actor (As the World Turns), suicide by gunshot.
Wilbert Hopper, 73, Canadian businessman, president, CEO and chairman of Petro-Canada.
Gwyn Jones, 89, Welsh physicist and public servant.
Lorraine Hunt Lieberson, 52, American mezzo-soprano opera singer, breast cancer.
Lars Korvald, 90, Norwegian politician, Prime Minister of Norway.
Sir Carol Mather, 87, British Conservative MP.
Nimrod Ping, 58, British politician, Brighton city councillor. Complications of liver disease, caused by Hepatitis C.
Jack Smith, 92, American musician and host of You Asked for It, leukemia.
Joe Weaver, 71, American musician, leader of the Blue Note Orchestra and musician on early Tamla sessions, stroke.

4
John Hinde, 94, Australian film reviewer and journalist.
Norbert Kerckhove, 73, Belgian cyclist.
Dorothy Hayden Truscott, 80, American world champion bridge player and author, complications of Parkinson's Disease.

5
Barbara Albright, 51, American author of food and knitting books, brain tumor.
Gert Fredriksson, 86, Swedish canoeist and Sweden's most successful Olympian, cancer.
Lewis Glucksman, 80, American head of U.S.-based financial giant Lehman Brothers.
Hans Gmoser, 73, Austrian-born founder heli-skiing business.
Kenneth Lay, 64, American businessman, CEO of U.S. energy firm Enron, later convicted of fraud, heart attack.
Don Lusher, 82, British jazz trombonist and band leader.
Paul Nelson, 69, American rock critic who worked for Rolling Stone and who signed the New York Dolls while working for Mercury Records.
Amzie Strickland, 87, American actress.
Prince Sione ʻUluvalu Ngū Takeivūlai Tukuʻaho, 56, Tongan Tuʻi Pelehake, car crash in Menlo Park, California.

6
Juan de Ávalos, 94, Spanish sculptor, heart attack.
Ralph Ginzburg, 76, U.S. publisher who fought two First Amendment battles during the 1960s, multiple myeloma.
Al Hodge, 55, English Cornish rock guitarist and songwriter, cancer.
John Manos, 83, U.S. and Ohio judge for 43 years.
Juan Pablo Rebella, 32, Uruguayan film director, suicide.
Kasey Rogers, 80, American actress (Bewitched) and motocross racer, stroke.
E. S. Turner, 96, English historian and journalist.
Tom Weir, 91, Scottish climber, author and broadcaster.

7
Luis Barragan, 34, American businessman and philanthropist, president of 1-800-Mattress, drowned.
Syd Barrett, 60, English musician, founding member of Pink Floyd, diabetes.
Rudi Carrell, 71, Dutch-born TV entertainer most active in Germany, lung cancer.
Dorothea Church, 83, African-American model, first successful black model in Paris.
John Warner Fitzgerald, 81, American lawyer, Chief Justice of the Michigan Supreme Court.
Elias Hrawi, 79, Lebanese politician, President of Lebanon (1989–98), cancer.
Dina Kaminskaya, 87, Russian lawyer who defended Soviet dissidents.
Eugene Kurtz, 82, American composer.
John Money, 84, New Zealand-born psychologist and sex researcher at Johns Hopkins University, Parkinson's disease.
Mícheál Ó Domhnaill, 53, Irish musician with the Bothy Band.
Eric Schopler, 79, German-born American psychologist known for his pioneering work in autism treatment, cancer.
Frank P. Zeidler, 93, American politician, Mayor of Milwaukee (1948–1960) and last Socialist Party of America mayor of a major city, died in his sleep.
Govindappa Venkataswamy, 87, Indian ophthalmologist, founder of Aravind Eye Hospitals.

8
George Albee, 84, American psychologist and former head of the American Psychological Association, argued that social problems contributed to mental illness.
June Allyson, 88, American actress, dancer and singer, pulmonary respiratory failure and acute bronchitis after a long illness.
Michael Barrett, 79, Irish politician.
Eric Bedford, 78, Australian politician, member of the Wran Government ministry 1976–1985 in New South Wales.
Franco Belgiorno-Nettis, 91, Australian industrialist and patron of the arts, founder of Transfield Holdings, Australia's largest engineering and construction firm, died after a fall.
David Bright, 49, American researcher into underwater exploration and shipwrecks, cardiac arrest stemming from decompression sickness.
Ana María Campoy, 80, Argentine actress, pneumonia.
Sir Richard Gorham, 88, Bermudian businessman and politician.
Peter Hawkins, 82, British actor and voice artist - voice of the Flower Pot Men, Captain Pugwash and the Daleks.
Catherine Leroy, 60, French photojournalist known for her coverage of the Vietnam War in Life, lung cancer.
Raja Rao, 97, Indian novelist (Kanthapura).
Jesse Simons, 88, American labor arbitrator, heart failure.
Dorothy Uhnak, 76, American policewoman turned novelist.

9
Chris Drake, 82, American actor.
Fred Epstein, 68, American pediatric neurosurgeon who developed new ways of operating on tumors, melanoma.
Abdel Moneim Madbouly, 84, Egyptian comedian and playwright, congestive heart failure.
Ireneusz Paliński, 74, Polish weightlifter, Olympic champion (1960).
Alan Senitt, 27, British political activist, stabbed to death.
George Hopkins Williams II, 91, American aviation historian.
Milan Williams, 58, American keyboardist, founding member of R&B/funk band the Commodores, cancer.
Michael Zinzun, 57, American ex-Black Panthers and anti-police activist, died in his sleep.

10
Shamil Basayev, 41, Chechen rebel leader, terrorist, explosion.
Tommy Bruce, 68, British singer ("Ain't Misbehavin'").
Robert Fumerton, 93, Canadian night fighter ace top-scorer of World War II.
Raymond Furnell, 71, British Dean of York from 1994 to 2003, responsible for introducing charges to visitors at York Minster, cancer.
Ahmad Nadeem Qasimi, 89, Pakistani Urdu poet, writer, critic and journalist who published 50 books.
Fred Wander, 89, Austrian author and Holocaust survivor.

11
Kathy Augustine, 50, American politician, State Controller of Nevada who was first Nevada state official to be impeached in office, murdered.
Phyllis Baker, 69, American baseball player (All-American Girls Professional Baseball League).
John Coletta, 74, English music manager and music producer, former manager of Deep Purple and Whitesnake, due to unspecified illness.
Neil Coulbeck, 54, British Royal Bank of Scotland executive questioned over Enron collapse, suicide.
Gerald Gidwitz, 99, American cosmetics executive, co-founder of Helene Curtis, congestive heart failure.
Barnard Hughes, 90, American Tony and Emmy Award-winning actor (Doc Hollywood, First Monday in October).
Fortunato Libanori, 72, Italian Grand Prix motorcycle road racer.
Bill Miller, 91, American pianist for Frank Sinatra, heart attack.
Derrick O'Brien, 31, American executed for the rape and murder of two teenage girls in Texas.
Bronwyn Oliver, 47, Australian sculptor, suicide.
Ruth Schönthal, 82, German-born classical pianist and composer.
John Spencer, 71, British former world champion snooker player, stomach cancer.
Philippe Takla, 91, Lebanese politician, lawyer and diplomat, foreign minister of Lebanon.
Wiarton Willie, 8, Canadian Groundhog Day prognosticator, following a long illness.

12
Rocky Barton, 49, American convicted murderer, executed in Ohio.
Kurt Kreuger, 89, Swiss-German actor (Sahara, The Enemy Below), stroke.
Hubert Lampo, 85, Belgian writer.
Loredana Nusciak, 64, Italian actress (Django, Ten Thousand Dollars for a Massacre) and model.

13
Red Buttons, 87, American comedian, vascular disease.
Pamela Cooper, 95, British refugee activist known for her work with the Palestinians.
John Lyttelton, 11th Viscount Cobham, 63, British aristocrat.
Ángel Suquía Goicoechea, 89, Spanish Metropolitan-Archbishop of Madrid.
Tomasz Zaliwski, 75, Polish actor.

14
Anthony Cave Brown, 77, English historian of espionage.
Tom Frame, British comic book letterer, cancer.
Heinrich Heidersberger, 100, German photographer.
William Lash III, 45, American assistant secretary of the U.S. Department of Commerce and professor at George Mason University, suicide after killing his 12-old autistic son.
Christophe Mérieux, 39, French head of research at BioMérieux and intended successor to Alain Mérieux as Chief Executive, heart attack.
Carrie Nye, 69, American actress, lung cancer.
Len Teeuws, 79, American offensive and defensive lineman for the Los Angeles Rams and the Chicago Cardinals.
Aleksander Wojtkiewicz, 43, Polish International Grandmaster of chess, perforated intestine, and massive bleeding.

15
Robert H. Brooks, 69, American chairman of Hooters of America, natural causes.
John Joseph Fitzpatrick, 87, Canadian Bishop of Brownsville for 20 years.
Howdy Groskloss, 100, American professional baseball player, oldest major league baseball player.
Kenneth Lochhead, 80, Canadian artist who was a member of the Regina Five, colorectal cancer.
James Nicholas, 85, American orthopedic surgeon and physician for three NFL teams.
István Pálfi, 39, Hungarian Member of the European Parliament, long illness.
Rupert Pole, 87, American actor, forest ranger, and co-husband of bigamist Anaïs Nin.
Francis Rose, 84, British botanist.
Andrée Ruellan, 101, American painter.
Alireza Shapour Shahbazi, 63, Iranian archaeologist, stomach cancer.
Andrew Sudduth, 44, American rower who won an Olympic silver medal, pancreatic cancer.

16
Walter Binaghi, 87, Argentine ICAO Council President.
Keith DeVries, 69, American archaeologist at the University of Pennsylvania, excavated Gordion.
Kevin Hughes, 53, British Labour MP for Doncaster North, motor neurone disease.
Bob Orton, Sr., 76, American professional wrestler, heart attack.
Destiny Norton, 5, American child, kidnapped and murdered.
Ossi Reichert, 80, German alpine skier, Olympic Champion 1956.
Winthrop Paul Rockefeller, 57, American billionaire and Lieutenant Governor of Arkansas since 1996, myeloproliferative disorder.
Malachi Thompson, 56, American jazz trumpeter, lymphoma.

17
Setsuro Ebashi, 83, Japanese physiologist.
Galen Fiss, 75, American Cleveland Browns linebacker.
Keith LeClair, 40, U.S. college baseball coach, Lou Gehrig's Disease.
Barbara Liebrich, 83, American baseball player (AAGPBL).
Robert Mardian, 82, American Republican party official, attorney for Richard Nixon, figure in the Watergate scandal, lung cancer.
Sam Myers, 70, American blues musician, who won nine W.C. Handy Awards with his band the Rockets, throat cancer.
Mickey Spillane, 88, American author, creator of Mike Hammer detective fiction, pancreatic cancer.
Reg Turnbull, 98, Australian politician.

18
Raul Cortez, 73, Brazilian actor, pancreatic cancer.
Henry Hewes, 89, American Saturday Review theater critic and editor of Best Plays (1960–1964).
Jimmy Leadbetter, 78, Scottish Ipswich Town footballer.
David Maloney, 72, British television director and producer for Doctor Who and Blake's 7.
Sir James Menter, 84, British physicist.
V. P. Sathyan, 41, Indian football player, captain of the India national football team, apparent suicide.

19
Pat Davey, 93, Australian footballer (Richmond).
Sam Neely, 58, American singer-songwriter, collapsed while mowing his lawn.
Jack Warden, 85, American actor Emmy Award-winning (Heaven Can Wait, While You Were Sleeping), heart and kidney failure.
George Wetherill, 80, American astrophysicist, winner of the National Medal of Science.
Tudi Wiggins, 70, Canada-born soap opera actor, cancer.

20
Ugo Attardi, 83, Italian painter, sculptor and writer.
Charles Bettelheim, 92, French Marxist economist and historian.
Robert Cornthwaite, 89, American character actor (Thing From Another World).
Paddy Dunne, 77, Irish politician, Lord Mayor of Dublin (1975–1976) and senator.
Ted Grant, 93, South African-British Trotskyist politician. 
Brandon Hedrick, 27, American convicted murderer and rapist, execution by electric chair in Virginia.
Lim Kim San, 89, Singaporean politician, cabinet minister of Singapore.
Frank Nabarro, 90, English-born South African physicist who was a pioneer of solid state physics.
Harry Olivieri, 90, American restaurateur, co-inventor of the Philly cheesesteak and co-founder of Pat's King of Steaks cheesesteak emporium.
Gérard Oury, 87, French actor, screenwriter and film director.

21
Mako, 72, Japanese-American film, television, and Broadway actor; esophageal cancer.
Ta Mok, 80, Cambodian military chief, Khmer Rouge commander, known as "The Butcher.".
J. Madison Wright Morris, 21, American child actress, heart attack.
Alexander Petrenko, 30, Russian international basketballer, car crash.
Gianmario Roveraro, 70, Italian banker and founder of Akros Finanziaria, missing since 5 July, murder.
Bert Slater, 70, Scottish footballer.

22

Heather Bratton, 19, American model, car accident.
Donald Reid Cabral, 83, Dominican politician and lawyer, foreign minister of the Dominican Republic.
José Antonio Delgado, 41, Venezuelan mountaineer, first Venezuelan to climb Mount Everest, found dead on Nanga Parbat in Pakistan.
Gianfrancesco Guarnieri, 71, Italian-Brazilian actor, complications from kidney disease.
Jessie Mae Hemphill, 82, American award-winning blues musician, complications of an infection.
Thomas J. Manton, 73, American longtime Democratic leader of Queens, NY, former US Representative (1985–99), prostate cancer.
Dika Newlin, 82, American musician and musicologist, scholar of Arnold Schoenberg.
Charles Knox Robinson III, 74, American actor, from complications of Parkinson's disease, in Palm Springs, CA.
James E. West, 55, American politician, mayor of Spokane, Washington, colorectal cancer.
Russell J. York, 84, American World War II veteran and hero of the battle for the Hurtgen Forest on November 20, 1944.

23
Charles E. Brady, Jr., 54, American former astronaut.
Jean-Paul Desbiens, 79, French-Canadian author of Les insolences du Frère Untel, heart attack.
James Callan Graham, 91, American lawyer and politician.
Vernon Grant, 71, American cartoonist.
Besby Holmes, 88, US Air Force fighter pilot, participant in air action that killed Admiral Yamamoto.
John Mack, 78, American oboist, complications from brain cancer.
Frederick Mosteller, 89, American Harvard professor of statistics, founding chair of the department of statistics, sepsis.
Terence Otway, 92, British soldier, commander of the assault on the Merville Battery on D-Day.

24
Janka Bryl, 89, Belarusian writer.
Heinrich Hollreiser, 93, German conductor.
Bill Long, 88, Canadian ice hockey coach.
Leon Morris, 92, Australian theologian.

25
Carl Brashear, 75, American first black US Navy diver, portrayed by Cuba Gooding Jr. in the film Men of Honor, heart failure.
Ezra Fleischer, 78, Romanian-born Israeli poet, winner of the Israel Prize, and professor at Hebrew University.
Hani Mohsin Hanafi, 41, Malaysian actor and television game show host, heart attack.
Lydia, Duchess of Bedford, 88, British peer, second wife of John Russell, 13th Duke of Bedford.
Bill Meistrell, 77, American businessman, founder of the Body Glove wet suit company, Parkinson's disease.
Aldo Notari, 74, Italian president of the International Baseball Federation.
Dame Mildred Riddelsdell, 92, British civil servant.
Bob Simpson, 61, British retired senior BBC correspondent.

26
Floyd Dixon, 77, American R&B pianist, kidney failure.
Vincent J. Fuller, 75, American lawyer who defended John Hinckley, Jr., lung cancer.
Jessie Gilbert, 19, British chess player, youngest Women's World Amateur Championship winner, fall.
Rolf Arthur Hansen, 86, Norwegian government minister.
Roi Klein, Israeli IDF Major, won Medal of Courage.
Darrell Martinie, 63, American astrologer known as "the Cosmic Muffin", cancer.
Princess Tatiana von Metternich, 91, Russian-born German aristocrat, World War II diarist, and arts patron.

27
Maryann Mahaffey, 81, American member of Detroit city council, leukemia.
Sir Charles Mills, 91, British admiral.
Carlos Roque, 70, Portuguese comic book artist.
Alexandru Șafran, 95, Romanian and Swiss rabbi, Chief Rabbi of Romania who tried to stop the deportation of Jews by the pro-Nazi regime during World War II.
Elisabeth Volkmann, 70, German actress, German voice of Marge Simpson.
Johnny Weissmuller Jr., 65, American actor, son of Johnny Weissmuller, liver cancer.
Funsho Williams, 58, Nigerian politician, strangled.

28
Patrick Allen, 79, British actor.
Rut Brandt, 86, Norwegian resistance fighter, second wife of former German chancellor Willy Brandt.
Nigel Cox, 55, New Zealand novelist, cancer.
Abdallah Isaaq Deerow, 56, Somali politician, Constitution and Federalism Minister of Somalia, assassination.
Harold Enarson, 87, American academic, president of Ohio State University (1972–1981), fired football coach Woody Hayes, hydrocephalus.
David Gemmell, 57, British fantasy novelist.
Joel Hedgpeth, 94, American marine biologist and Californian environmental activist.
Richard Mock, 61, American painter, sculptor, and editorial cartoonist.
Sep Smith, 94, English Leicester City footballer, and oldest living England international player.
Billy Walsh, 85, Irish Manchester City footballer & Grimsby Town manager, who played international football for both Ireland teams, the FAI XI and the IFA XI, and New Zealand.

29
Hani Awijan, 29, Palestinian leader of Palestinian Islamic Jihad's military wing, The Al-Quds brigades, in Nablus, West Bank, killed by gunfire.
Guido Daccò, 63, Italian racing driver, who competed in Formula 3000, 24 Hours of Le Mans, & Champ Cars.
José López Rosario, 30, Puerto Rican drug dealer.
Jean Baker Miller, 78, American psychiatrist.
James Olin, 86, American politician, member of the United States House of Representatives (1982–1992).
Pierre Vidal-Naquet, 76, French historian and activist, cerebral haemorrhage.

30
Duygu Asena, 60, Turkish writer and civil-rights advocate, brain tumour.
Al Balding, 82, Canadian golfer, cancer.
Murray Bookchin, 85, American author, heart failure.
Philip D'Arcy Hart, 106, British medical researcher.
Anthony Galla-Rini, 102, American concert accordionist, heart failure.
Akbar Mohammadi, 37, Iranian student dissident, heart attack following a hunger strike and torture.
Zdravko Rajkov, 78, Serbian football player and manager.

31
Dugald Christie, 65, Canadian lawyer who fought for equitable access to legal services, bicycle accident.
Simón Echeverría, 34, Chilean record producer, pancreatic cancer.
Paul Eells, 70, American sportscaster, voice of the Arkansas Razorbacks football and basketball for radio and television, car accident.
Mario Faustinelli, 81, Italian comic book artist.
Frederick Kilgour, 92, American librarian, founder of OCLC Online Computer Library Center.Persona 2,7,Persona 3 existed

References

2006-07
 07